The Starship Trap is a Star Trek: The Original Series novel written by Mel Gilden.

Plot
While traveling to an important diplomatic meeting, the USS Enterprise is attacked by a Klingon warship. Managing to secure a truce, Kirk discovers the Klingon captain thought he was gaining revenge for vanishing Klingon ships. Kirk and his crew soon learn that ships from all over known space are vanishing. They race to stop the phenomenon before interstellar war breaks out.

References

External links

Novels based on Star Trek: The Original Series
1993 American novels
American science fiction novels